Edoardo Mazza (born 15 March 1964) is an Italian former professional tennis player.

Born in Rome, Mazza competed on the professional tour in the 1980s and reached a career best ranking of 152.

Mazza, a right-handed player, won a Challenger title at Knokke in 1987. His best performance on the Grand Prix circuit was a win over the fourth seeded Guillermo Pérez Roldán at Madrid in 1988, with the Argentine player ranked 26 in the world at the time.

Challenger titles

Singles: (1)

References

External links
 
 

1964 births
Living people
Italian male tennis players
Tennis players from Rome